Norbert Gombos (born 13 August 1990), occasionally spelled Norbert Gomboš, is a Slovak professional tennis player competing primarily on the ATP Challenger Tour and playing for the Slovakia Davis Cup team. He achieved a career-high ATP singles ranking of World No. 80 on 2 October 2017. He is currently the No. 2 Slovak tennis player in singles.

Personal life
He is a member of the Hungarian community in Slovakia.

Performance timeline

Singles 
Current through the 2022 Davis Cup.

Challenger and Futures finals

Singles: 27 (10–17)

Doubles: 5 (1–4)

Record against top 10 players
Gombos' record against players who have been ranked in the top 10, with those who are active in boldface. Only ATP Tour main draw matches are considered:

References

External links
 
 
 
 
 
 

1990 births
Living people
Slovak male tennis players
Tennis players at the 2020 Summer Olympics
Slovak people of Hungarian descent
Hungarians in Slovakia
People from Galanta
Sportspeople from the Trnava Region
Olympic tennis players of Slovakia